The 1999–2000 season was Motherwell's 2nd season in the Scottish Premier League, and their 15th consecutive season in the top division of Scottish football.

First team squad

Competitions

Scottish Premier League

Results

Source:

Scottish Cup

Scottish League Cup

Source:

League table

Statistics

Appearances

|}

Source:

Top scorers

Source:

Disciplinary record

Overall

Scottish Premier League

Results summary

Results by round

Results by opponent

Source: 1999–2000 Scottish Premier League article

See also
 List of Motherwell F.C. seasons

References

1999-2000
Scottish football clubs 1999–2000 season